Dawson School is an independent, private, co-educational, college preparatory day school founded in 1970.

References

External links
 Official school website

Schools in Boulder County, Colorado
Lafayette, Colorado